Paul Bell (born June 24, 1980 in Kenwyn, Western Cape) is a South African baseball infielder. Bell signed with the Milwaukee Brewers of Major League Baseball in 2000. He also played for the South Africa national baseball team at the 2000 Summer Olympics and the 2006 World Baseball Classic.

Professional career
Bell played three seasons of professional baseball in the Brewers system. He appeared in 90 total games, got 72 hits for a .238 career batting average. He never played above the A level and left the team after 19 games with the Beloit Brewers.

References

External links

1980 births
Living people
Arizona League Brewers players
Baseball players at the 2000 Summer Olympics
Baseball second basemen
Baseball shortstops
Baseball third basemen
Beloit Snappers players
Helena Brewers players
Ogden Raptors players
Olympic baseball players of South Africa
South African baseball players
South African expatriate baseball players in the United States
Sportspeople from Cape Town
2006 World Baseball Classic players